A tax incentive is an aspect of a government's taxation policy designed to incentivize or encourage a particular economic activity by reducing tax payments.

Tax incentives can have both positive and negative impacts on an economy. Among the positive benefits, if implemented and designed properly, tax incentives can attract investment to a country. Other benefits of tax incentives include increased employment, higher number of capital transfers, research and technology development, and also improvement to less developed areas. Though it is difficult to estimate the effects of tax incentives, they can, if done properly, raise the overall economic welfare through increasing economic growth and government tax revenue (after the expiration of the tax holiday/incentive period). However, tax incentive can cause negative effects on a government's financial condition, among other negative effects, if they are not properly designed and implemented.
 
There are four typical costs to tax incentives:
 resource allocation costs
 compliance costs
 revenue costs
 corruption costs.

Resource allocation refers to lost government tax revenue resulting from the tax incentive. The second cost refers to the situation when the tax incentives lead to too much investment in a certain area of the economy and too little investment in other areas of the economy. Revenue cost is associated with enforcing the tax incentive and monitoring who is receiving the incentive and ensuring they are properly deserving of the incentive. Therefore, the higher and the more complex the tax incentive, the higher the compliance costs because of the larger number of people and firms attempting to secure the tax incentive. The final cost is similar to the third in that it relates to people abusing the tax incentive. Corruption occurs when there are no clear guidelines or minimal guidelines for qualification.

According to a 2020 study of tax incentives in the United States, "states spent between 5 USD and 216 USD per capita on incentives for firms." There is some evidence that this leads to direct employment gains but there is not strong evidence that the incentives increase economic growth. Tax incentives that target individual companies are generally seen as inefficient, economically costly, and distortionary, as well as having regressive economic effects.

Disambiguation

Many "tax incentives" simply remove part of, or all the burden of the tax from whatever market transaction is taking place. That is because almost all taxes impose what economists call an excess burden or a deadweight loss. Deadweight loss is the difference between the amount of economic productivity that would occur without the tax and that which occurs with the tax.

For example, if savings are taxed, people save less than they otherwise would. If non-essential goods are taxed, people buy less. If wages are taxed, people work less. Finally, if activities like entertainment and travel are taxed, consumption is reduced.

Sometimes, the goal is to reduce such market activity, as in the case of taxing cigarettes. However, reducing activity is most often not a goal because greater market activity is considered to be desirable.

When a tax incentive is spoken of, it usually means removing all or some tax and thus reduce its burden.

Pseudo-incentives

Regardless of the fact that an incentive spurs economic activity, many use the term to refer to any relative change in taxation that changes economic behavior. Such pseudo-incentives include tax holidays, tax deductions, or tax abatement. Such "tax incentives" are targeted at both individuals and corporations.

Individual incentives
Individual tax incentives are a prominent form of incentive and include deductions, exemptions, and credits. Specific examples include the mortgage interest deduction, individual retirement account, and hybrid tax credit.

Another form of an individual tax incentive is the income tax incentive. Though mostly used in transitioning and developing countries, usually correlating with insufficient domestic capita, the income tax incentive is meant to help the economic welfare of direct investors and corresponds with investing in production activities and finally, many times is meant to attract foreign investors.

These incentives are introduced for various reasons. Firstly, they are seen to counterbalance investment disincentives stemming from the normal tax system. Others use the incentives to equalize disadvantages to investing such as complicated laws and insufficient infrastructure.

Corporate tax incentives
Corporate tax incentives can be raised at federal, state, and local government levels. For example, in the United States, the federal tax code provides a wide range of incentives for corporations, totaling $109 billion in 2011, according to a Tax Foundation Study.

The Tax Foundation categorizes US federal tax incentives into four main categories, listed below:
 Tax exclusions for local bonds valued at $12.4 billion.
 Preferences aimed at advancing social policy, valued at $9 billion.
 Preferences that directly benefit specific industries, valued at $17.4 billion.
 Preferences broadly available to most corporate taxpayers, valued at $68.7 billion.

Corporate tax incentives provided by state and local governments are also included in the US tax code but are very often directed at individual companies involved in a corporate site selection project. Site selection consultants negotiate these incentives, which are typically specific to the corporate project the state is recruiting, rather than applicable to a broader industry. Examples include the following:

 Corporate income tax credit
 Property tax abatement
 Sales tax exemption
 Payroll tax refund

In Armenia, corporate income tax incentive is available for Armenian resident entities that meet several criteria under the government’s export promotion-oriented program. Those entities that are part of the government approved program receive reduced corporate income tax rates up to tenfold from the 20% rate. 
Taxpayers running their operations in free economics zones (FEZ) are free from corporate income tax in respect of income received from activities implemented in free economic zones in Armenia.

List of largest US tax incentive deals
Washington: Boeing, $8.7 billion until 2040, partly for the 777X
New York: Alcoa, $5.6 billion
Washington: Boeing, $3.2 billion
Oregon: Nike, $2 billion
New Mexico: Intel, $2 billion
Louisiana: Cheniere Energy, $1.7 billion
Pennsylvania: Royal Dutch Shell, $1.65 billion over 25 years for the Pennsylvania Shell ethylene cracker plant
Missouri: Cerner Corp., $1.64 billion
Michigan: Chrysler, $1.3 billion
Nevada: Tesla Gigafactory 1, $1.25 billion over 20 years
Mississippi: Nissan Canton, $1.25 billion

Historical preservation tax incentive
Not all tax incentives are structured for individuals or corporations, as some tax incentives are meant to help the welfare of the society.  For example, the historical preservation tax incentive.  The US federal government pushes, in many situations, to preserve historical buildings. One way the government does so is through tax incentives for the rehabilitation of historic buildings. The tax incentives to preserve the historic buildings can generate jobs, increase private investment in the city, create housing for low-income individuals in the historic buildings, and enhance property values.  Currently, according to the Tax Reform Act of 1986, there are two major incentives in this category.  The first incentive is a tax credit of 20% for rehabilitation of historic structures. A historic structure is defined as a building listed in the National Register of Historic Places or a building in a registered historic district, acknowledged by the National Park Service. The second incentive is a tax credit of 10% for rehabilitation of structures built before 1936 but are considered non-residential and non-historical.

Impact
According to a 2020 study, tax competition "primarily reduces taxes for mobile firms and is unlikely to substantially affect the efficiency of business location." A 2020 NBER paper found some evidence that state and local business tax incentives in the United States led to employment gains but no evidence that the incentives increased broader economic growth at the state and local level.

A 2021 study found that multinational firms boosted wages and employment in localities, but that the surplus that the firms generated tended to go back to them in the form of local subsidies.

See also
 Taxation in the United States
 Tax exemption
 Tax competition
Texas Tax Code Chapter 313

References

External links

Tax terms

ru:Налоговые льготы